Hellisøy Lighthouse is a coastal lighthouse in Fedje municipality in Vestland county, Norway.  The lighthouse lies on the small island of Hellisøy, just off the southwest coast of the larger island of Fedje.

History
This tower was built in 1855, making it Norway's second-oldest cast iron lighthouse.  It is essentially a copy of the Eigerøy Lighthouse built a year earlier on the southwest coast.  The lighthouse was automated in 1992.

The lighthouse emits a continuous white light with a more intense flash every 30 seconds. There is a 3rd order Fresnel lens in the lighthouse that has been in use since 1903.

See also

 List of lighthouses in Norway
 Lighthouses in Norway

References

External links

 Norsk Fyrhistorisk Forening 

Fedje
Lighthouses completed in 1855
Lighthouses in Vestland